Gonocarpus oreophilus is an Australian shrub in the watermilfoil family Haloragaceae. First collected by botanical sciene by C.T. White at the Mcpherson Range in 1915. The natural range of distribution is from the Barrington Tops region to south east Queensland, in moist forest country. The specific epithet (oreophilus) refers to the preference of a mountain habitat. Derived from the Ancient Greek words oros meaning "mountain" or "hill".

References

Flora of Queensland
Flora of New South Wales
oreophilus
Plants described in 1975